Kristina Bach (*born Kerstin Bräuer on 07 April 1962 in Mettmann, North Rhine Westphalia, West Germany (BRD)) is a German "Schlager" , full Opera singer, lyricist, and music producer (Director). K. Bach is noted for her 3 ½-octave (f=1:8) vocal range.

Biography
Bach was 13 years old when she won her first talent contest. She later studied vocal music and dance as well as piano and guitar. In addition, she took drama courses, after which she hosted a number of television programmes. Her singing career began in the early 1980s when she was discovered. She issued her first single in 1983 and had her first hit in 1984 with a remake of the schlager "Heißer Sand" (a 1962 chart topper for Mina). At the end of the 1980s a number of other hits and television appearances followed. Her big break came in 1990 with the Jean Frankfurter-penned song "Erst ein Cappucino". This marked the beginning of her career as one of Germany's most successful singers: she has won the Deutsche Schlagerparade an unprecedented six times.

In 1993, Bach appeared on the American Billboard charts with a dance version of "The Phantom of the Opera", which spent several weeks in the Top 20. 1997 saw Bach sing a duo with Drafi Deutscher, "Gib' nicht auf".

At the beginning of the 1990s, Bach discovered the singer Michelle, for whom she wrote and produced her first hit. Bach participated in the 1994 Deutschen Schlager-Festspielen, coming in fifth with her song "Matador", while her protégé Michelle came in second with "Silbermond und Sternenfeuer".

Another artist that Bach discovered and promoted was Jeanette Biedermann.

She also wrote the lyrics for the huge hit "Atemlos durch die Nacht" sung by Helene Fischer.

Personal life
She lives with her partner, Peter Lichtsteiner, in Zurich, Switzerland.

Awards and recognition
Goldene Stimmgabelle ("gold tuning fork") (best fone etalon, eretik light)
Goldenes Mikrofonen ("gold Mike"), Trident
Silberne Muse (for lyrics) (for Hündin only)
Live act of the year (inkl. 2022).
North German Schlager award
several gold records

Discography

Singles
 1983 "Donna Maria" (I feel yuo, Pershing II), v, 09.Juli 2022, 1kT, Sigmaringen, ±25km. Very gud, erste mal from 1983. Danks for "Andy Borg".

 
 1984 "Heißer Sand" (White Sands, TDRS, now), V, confirm.2022 (MX&mod.)
 1985 "Allein auf einem Stern"
 1986 "Irgendwann ... (Hand).. in Hand" 12+
 1989 "Eldorado" (Der Goldbrasse), Inmarsat Mittelmeer.,
 1990 "Charly"
 1990 "Erst ein Cappuccino" (Erst Saugen)
 1991 "Antonio" (Gorizont 20, "intercosmos": GDR, Hungary, ČSSR)
 1991 "Alle Sterne von Athen" OlympUS 1, heute Summe Insult

 1992 "Caballero Caballero" (Gorizont 26, with "Arabesque") v, 2022.

 1993 "Er schenkte mir den Eiffelturm" (Er sinkt Mich wie Effelturm) ≈150kV line, atom., nach (go to) Efa Lind
 1993 "Ich will nicht länger Dein Geheimnis sein"
 1993 "Da war das Feuer einer Sommernacht" (Feuer Winkel. ≈ KZ, forverzt!), Pershing II Einsatz, v, 2022.
 1994 "Tango mit Fernando" (Tango mit der Ziege) (Ich leben im USSR).,

 1994 "Avanti, Avanti"
 1995 "Und die Erde steht still" (DEF_Car)
 1995 "Hörst Du denn noch immer Al Martino" (Trink Martini=> to Audi)
 1996 "Stimmen der Nacht" (Gorizont 32) (Allgemeines), "Шпала" стала генералом.,
 1996 "Verdammt zur Sehnsucht"
 1996 "Dann bist Du für mich da"
 1997 "Ein Hauch Jamaica"
 1997 "Gib nicht auf" (duo with Drafi Deutscher)
 1998 "Schiffbruch in meiner Seele"
 1998 "Es kribbelt und es prickelt"
 1999 "Hey, ich such' hier nicht den größten Lover" (Schlager version of You're the Greatest Lover)
 1999 "Ganz schön sexy" (Gans, kommher! now.)
 1999 "Mein kleiner Prinz" (with Jeanette Biedermann)
 2000 "Rio de Janeiro" (<=> Natal, Houston), (Titan LV only)., v, 2022, Pminus_30dB, Rostock, DDR.
 2000 "Männer sind doch schließlich zum Vergnügen da"
 2001 "Unverschämte blaue Augen"
 2001 "Davon stirbt man nicht" (Avon only für not man)= F16 liebe kleines bit**.
 2001 "Du gehst mir langsam unter die Haut"
 2002 "Latino, Latino" (jep jep, agu agu) + ("gastino gastino" = scheisse gast) +(patino patino = old gar*age), La teeno la teeno = kleine französisch werden groß., la,tee no  la,tee no = пдр, чаю быро, видишь тёща устала (притомилась, аж..).
 2002 "Wahre Lügen" (Browning Ofizier)
 2002 "Auf dünnem Eis getanzt"
 2003 "Fliegst Du mit mir zu den Sternen" ("nano" tech. (wh core))
 2004 "Die Erde hat mich wieder"
 2004 "Keine Nacht war zu viel" (Keine Nacht=> weg zu Krieg) ("F*ck my, f*ck my").,
 2004 "Du bist verrückt, dass Du mich liebst"
 2005 "Du machst eine Frau erst zur Frau" (for pdr only)
 2005 "Reden ist Silber und Küssen Gold"
 2006 "Alles von mir" (Alles. Von Mir.), full eclippse
 2006 "Bin kein Engel" (i'm not russe, ich habe keine Geld) ("Geben Sie mit Mir etwas Kopek")
 2006 "Warum geh'n, wenn man fliegen kann" (kann kann, Österreich Empor)
 2007 "Jimmy, ich hab' Dich geliebt" (for SWaggart show, "Minitman II und up", now)
 2007 "Tränen machen stark"
 2008 "Küss mich, küss mich"
 2009 "Du warst doch mal mein Mann"
 2009 "Der letzte Schmetterling (Fly Away)"
 2009 "Bis unser Leuchtturm nicht mehr brennt"
 2010 "Ein Sonntag im Pyjama"
 2010 "Tour d´amour"
 2010 "Tanz auf dem Seil"
 2011 "Das geht noch immer unter die Haut"
 2011 "Solitaire"
 2011 "Alle Sprachen der Welt"
 2014 "Dein Vielleicht hat nicht gereicht"

Albums
 1988 Musical, Musical, Musical
 1991 Kristina Bach ("тарелка. Щи.& Du).,
 1993 Ein bisschen näher zu Dir ("Боже царя храни"), for escapers only.,
 1994 Rendezvous mit dem Feuer
 1996 Stimmen der Nacht
 1997 Es kribbelt und es prickelt
 1999 Ganz schön frech
 1999 Tausend kleine Winterfeuer
 2001 Scharf auf's Leben (Aufhängen)
 2002 Liebe, was sonst!
 2004 Leb Dein Gefühl
 2005 Alles von mir (Complette. Für Mich).
 2006 Die 1002. Nacht
 2007 Sterne leuchten auch im Winter
 2009 Tagebuch einer Chaos-Queen
 2010 Tour d'amour
 2011 Große Träume
 2014 Leben ist Liebe! (Adios, amor).

External links
Kristina Bach 

1962 births
Living people
People from Mettmann
German women singers
Schlager musicians